Ivan Benjamin Elijah Toney (born 16 March 1996) is an English professional footballer who plays as a striker for  club Brentford.

Toney became the youngest player to represent Northampton Town when he made his first-team debut in 2012, and scored 13 goals in 60 matches across all competitions before joining Newcastle United in 2015. In his first season at Newcastle, he had two successive loan spells with Barnsley, winning the Football League Trophy and the League One play-offs. He spent the next two years on loan in League One with Shrewsbury Town, Scunthorpe United, and Wigan Athletic. 

In 2018, Toney joined Peterborough United permanently for an undisclosed fee, where he was named both League One top scorer and Player of the Season in 2019–20. He then signed for Brentford, which was then in the EFL Championship, where his record-setting 31 goals scored during the 2020–21 campaign helped the club earn promotion to the Premier League.

Club career

Northampton Town

Born in Northampton, Toney began his career at his hometown club Northampton Town. He made his first-team debut on 13 November 2012, in a 3–3 draw in the FA Cup first round away to Bradford City; he came on at the end of regulation time in place of Lewis Wilson as his team eventually lost 4–2 in a penalty shoot-out. At 16 years old he became the youngest first-team player in the club's history. The following day, he scored four goals in the FA Youth Cup, in a 5–0 win over York City. His only other appearance in a matchday squad that season was on 17 November, remaining unused in a 3–1 League Two win at home to Wycombe Wanderers.

Toney made his first start on 28 September 2013 in a goalless home draw against Morecambe, making way for Ben Tozer after 74 minutes. His first professional goals came on 26 April 2014, scoring two in the first half of a 3–0 victory away to Dagenham & Redbridge, the latter a bicycle kick. On 3 May, he scored a header as Northampton defeated Oxford United 3–1 at home to avoid relegation to the Conference Premier on the final day of the season.

On 12 August 2014, Toney scored a header in a 3–2 win away to Championship team Wolverhampton Wanderers in the first round of the League Cup. His first goals of the league season arrived on 20 September; on as a substitute for Lawson D'Ath, he scored twice in a home contest against Accrington Stanley but his team nonetheless lost 5–4. A week later, his header was the only goal in victory away to Morecambe. Toney received the first red card of his career on 26 December in a 3–2 home defeat to Bury, being dismissed for fighting with visiting defender Hayden White.

In November 2014, Toney was close to a transfer to Wolverhampton Wanderers, which collapsed due to an undisclosed medical issue.

Newcastle United

After 13 goals in 60 appearances for Northampton across all competitions, Toney signed for Premier League club Newcastle United on 6 August 2015 on a long-term contract for an undisclosed fee. He made his debut on 25 August in the second round of the League Cup, replacing Massadio Haïdara for the final 12 minutes of a 4–1 home win over his former team. On 26 September, he played his first league match for Newcastle, as an 85th-minute substitute for Aleksandar Mitrović in a 2–2 home draw against Chelsea.

Loan spells
On 9 November 2015, Toney joined League One club Barnsley on a 28-day youth loan. He made his debut the next day in the Northern quarter-finals of the Football League Trophy, starting in a 2–1 home win over York. On 5 December, he scored his first goal for Barnsley away to Wigan Athletic in the Trophy's next round, a header in a 2–2 draw, and also converted his attempt as they won in the subsequent penalty shoot-out. A week later, he scored his first league goal for the club, deciding a 3–2 win away to Colchester United with a header from Marley Watkins' cross.

On 24 March 2016, Toney returned to Barnsley on loan for the remainder of the season. On 3 April, in the 2016 Football League Trophy Final against Oxford United at Wembley Stadium, he came on as a 65th-minute substitute for top scorer Sam Winnall. He took a shot which rebounded for Ashley Fletcher to give Barnsley a 2–1 lead, and they eventually won 3–2. Barnsley won promotion with a 3–1 victory over Millwall at the same ground on 29 May; Toney replaced Fletcher for the last nine minutes.

The following season, Toney joined League One club Shrewsbury Town on 8 August 2016 on a half-season loan. He scored his first goal for the club, converting a penalty after being fouled by Charles Dunne, in a 3–2 win away to Oldham Athletic on 3 September, and added another a week later to equalise in a 1–1 draw away to Bury. On 24 September, he was sent off in a 1–1 draw away to AFC Wimbledon for a late challenge on opposition goalkeeper James Shea.

Having scored seven goals in 26 appearances across all competitions for Shrewsbury, Toney was loaned to fellow League One club Scunthorpe United on 12 January 2017 for the remainder of the 2016–17 season. Two days later he made his debut for the Iron, replacing Kevin van Veen for the final ten minutes of a 2–1 win on his return to Northampton. On 28 January, he made a first start and scored in a 3–2 home win over Port Vale, putting Scunthorpe in first place.

On 2 August 2017, Toney returned to League One, joining Wigan Athletic for the upcoming season. He made his debut three days later, starting as they began the campaign with a 1–0 win away to Milton Keynes Dons. His first goal for his new team came on 19 August, opening a 2–0 win away to Oldham Athletic. However, his deal was cut short, as he returned to Newcastle on 10 January 2018.

Toney re-signed on loan for Scunthorpe United on 11 January 2018. He scored his first goal back in a Scunthorpe shirt on 3 February 2018, netting the winner in a 3–2 away victory over Fleetwood Town.

Peterborough United
Toney signed for League One club Peterborough United on 9 August 2018 on a long-term contract for an undisclosed fee, reported by some sources as £650,000. He made his debut two days later in a 4–1 win at Rochdale as a 72nd-minute substitute for two-goal Jason Cummings. On 8 September, coming on for the same player, he scored his first goal for the Posh to win 3–2 at Southend United.

He scored a hat-trick on 11 December in a 4–4 draw in the second round replay of the FA Cup away to Bradford City – starting with a free kick from near the halfway line – but missed in the subsequent penalty shootout although his team won nonetheless. Eighteen days later he recorded another treble in a 4–0 win at Accrington Stanley. On 23 February 2019, Toney was sent off in the first half-hour of a 2–1 home loss to former team Shrewsbury, for handling the ball on the goal line.

Toney began the 2019–20 season with seven goals in the first seven league games, concluding with a hat-trick in a 6–0 home win over Rochdale on 14 September. The following month, he asked a chant sung by Peterborough fans about the size of his genitalia to be changed to make it more family-friendly.

Toney scored nine times in his last seven games before the season was abandoned in March 2020 due to the COVID-19 pandemic. He was voted Player of the Season at the EFL Awards.

Brentford
On 31 August 2020, Toney completed a medical and signed for Championship club Brentford on a five-year deal. The fee was reported to be in the region of £5 million and around £10 million with add-ons, Peterborough's record transfer fee. Among the other clubs to want him was Premier League side Tottenham Hotspur, but only as a back-up to Harry Kane. He scored his first goal for Brentford, a penalty, in a 1–1 draw with Millwall on 26 September; in each of his next three games, he scored twice.

On 20 January 2021, Toney assisted the only goal of a home win over Luton Town, before being dismissed in added time for an altercation with Tom Lockyer. Ten days later, he contributed a hat-trick to a 7–2 win over Wycombe Wanderers, also at the Brentford Community Stadium. In April, he was nominated for the EFL Championship Player of the Season.

On 8 May 2021, Toney scored his 31st league goal of the season against Bristol City, setting a new Championship record for most goals scored in a single season. Three weeks later, he scored in a 2–0 win over Swansea City in the 2021 EFL Championship play-off Final.

While at Brentford, the club stopped taking a knee against racism; Toney said that players were being "used as puppets" to make the gesture while society did not change. He also faced online racist abuse over the season. Following Brentford's decision to take the knee for the 2021–22 Premier League season alongside the other 19 clubs, Toney said he would not join his colleagues and would continue to stand.

On 13 August 2021, Toney started and played the full game in Brentford's first Premier League match, where they won 2–0 over Arsenal. On 5 March 2022, Toney scored Brentford's first Premier League hat-trick in a vital 3–1 away victory over Norwich City. On 3 September 2022, Toney scored his second Premier League hat-trick in a 5–2 home victory over Leeds United; his first goal was his 50th for the club, while the second and third goals were his first from outside the box since joining Brentford. 

With Brentford, Toney has emerged as an almost flawless penalty-taker, netting every penalty he has taken for the club, eight of them in the Premier League.

On 14 March 2023, a man who racially abused Toney on social media became the first person to be banned from every English stadium for three years.

International career
In March 2021, it was reported that Toney would be called up to the Jamaican national team, as part of a plan by the Jamaican Football Federation to purposely target a number of English-born players for call ups to increase the nation's chances of qualifying for the 2022 FIFA World Cup. Jamaican Football Federation president Michael Ricketts claimed that Toney was in the process of acquiring a Jamaican passport to play for the nation. Despite this, Toney reportedly rejected Jamaica's call, as he harboured an ambition to represent his country of birth.

On 15 September 2022, Toney received his first call up to the England national team for UEFA Nations League fixtures against Italy and Germany.

On 16 March, 2023, he was called into the squad for the Euro 2024 qualifying matches against Italy and Ukraine.

Controversies
On 16 November 2022, it was revealed that Toney had been charged by the Football Association with an alleged 232 breaches of its gambling laws. On 20 December 2022, Toney was charged by the FA with further 30 breaches of betting laws bringing the total charges to 262. He admitted many of the charges, but is contesting others. which could result in a several month-long ban. On March 2, Toney said he was "shocked and disappointed" to see press speculation about the case, especially since he had not yet had a formal hearing.

Career statistics

Honours
Barnsley
Football League Trophy: 2015–16
Football League One play-offs: 2016

Wigan Athletic
EFL League One: 2017–18

Brentford
EFL Championship play-offs: 2021

Individual
Brentford Supporters' Player of the Year: 2020–21
EFL Championship Golden Boot: 2020–21
EFL Championship Team of the Season: 2020–21
PFA EFL League One Team of the Year: 2019–20
PFA EFL Championship Team of the Year: 2020–21
EFL League One Player of the Year: 2019–20
London Football Awards: EFL Player of the Year: 2021
Premier League Goal of the Month: September 2022

Notes

References

External links

Profile at the Brentford F.C. website

1996 births
Living people
Footballers from Northampton
English footballers
Association football forwards
Northampton Town F.C. players
Newcastle United F.C. players
Barnsley F.C. players
Shrewsbury Town F.C. players
Scunthorpe United F.C. players
Wigan Athletic F.C. players
Peterborough United F.C. players
Brentford F.C. players
English Football League players
Premier League players
Black British sportsmen
English people of Jamaican descent
Sportspeople involved in betting scandals